Taíno creation myths are symbolic narratives about the origins of life, the Earth, and the universe, intrinsically shaped from the nature of the tropical islands the Taíno inhabited. The Taíno people were the predominant indigenous people of the Caribbean and were the ones who encountered the explorer Christopher Columbus and his men in 1492. They flourished across much of the Caribbean for nearly 1,000 years before the arrival of Europeans and were one of the region’s most developed cultures. 

The creation myths of the Taínos share similarities with other Native American cosmologies. The belief that in ancient mythical times, floods and civilizing heroes befell the world constitutes one of the most widespread concepts in Native American mythology, including in indigenous Taíno myths. Their creation myths are presented in terms of narratives where the events and the actors belong to a remote, primordial cosmos. A common feature of these myths is the expression of social laws that formulate proper and improper behavior; either characters behave in an opposite way from what is expected of an ordinary Taíno, or their behavior establishes proper Taínan behavior to be followed, and often a myth will exhibit an interplay of both kinds of behavior.

Sources 
Modern knowledge of Taíno creation myths comes from 16th century Spanish chroniclers investigating the indigenous Caribbean culture. Columbus was very much interested in knowing about the religion of the Taínos; In his original letter to the Queen, he expressed the opinion that the natives had no religion whatsoever, however this was an attempt to persuade Isabella that it would be easy to convert them to Christianity. Nevertheless, he ordered the Hieronymite Friar  who accompanied him on his second voyage, to study the religion of the natives of northern Hispaniola; the friar, later acquiring the native language, produced the volume titled as Legends and Beliefs of the Indians of the Antilles. In this work, Ramon Pane recorded not only the Taínos’ religious beliefs but also some of their myths. Because these narratives have an artistic, literary quality, Pane’s work is also considered the beginning of literature in the Americas. Unfortunately, the original Spanish manuscript has been lost, with only the Italian version including its many errors of transliteration surviving to the present day.

Another significant primary source comes from Father Bartolome de Las Casas, who wrote many books about the Taíno, including Historia de las Indias; although it was never finished, it has proved a rich source with a great deal of information about the customs of the natives. Las Casas came to the island in 1502, first as a colonizer using Taíno labor and treating them the same as other Spanish colonizers; however, soon he came to hate how badly these native people were mistreated, and decided to dedicate his life to improving their condition. In his writings he described how many of the cultural practices that Europeans considered objectionable in the Taíno had also been common among the Europeans’ own ancestors; using examples from Greek and Roman mythology, he tried to demonstrate that the thinking of the Taíno were not so different from that of Europe’s early pagans.

Although not all of Taíno myths have been preserved in the Spanish accounts, themes pertaining to their mythology are also symbolically encoded in their ritual material culture, objects such as sculptures, rattle gourds, and petroglyphs; it has been therefore possible for anthropologists to reconstruct some of the lost elements of these myths. For example, modern investigators have compared Pane's descriptions of Taíno art with archeological discoveries and the myths and vocabulary of other present-day Arawak groups. Thanks to these works, such as the research of José Juan Arrom, it has been possible to interpret the most important myths and Antillean divinities.

The Origin of the Sun and the Moon 
The cave of Iguanaboina was the primordial den from which the Sun emerges to illuminate the earth and to which it returns to hide as the moon emerges. In the book “An Account of the Antiquities of the Indians,” Arrom provides his account of Friar Ramon Pané’s discussion of Boinayel:

“They also say that the Sun and the Moon emerged from a cave called Iguanaboina, located in the country of a cacique [chief] named Mautiatihuel, and they hold it in great esteem and have it painted in their fashion, without any figures, with a lot of foliage and other such things. And in the said cave there were two zemis [cemis] made from stone, small ones, the size of half an arm, with their hands tied, and they seemed to be sweating. The Taíno valued those zemis very highly; and when it did not rain, they say that they would go in there to visit them, and it would rain at once. And one zemi they called Boinayel and the other Márohu”.

The Origins of Life and the Ocean, or Bagua 
The birth of the ocean and the life within it is the first act of creation of the Taíno universe. The tale is told in two different but closely related myths from Hispaniola. The same myths have also been artistically encoded in a sequence of petroglyphs located in the central precinct of the famous ceremonial center of Caguana in Puerto Rico. The first myth speaks of the powerful creator god called Yaya, considered the supreme being of the universe. Considered the life-giving spirit and causal force of creation that presides over the universe, Yaya plays multiple functions in the mythology, as supreme being, cacique, and father. The myth recounts how Yaya's son Yayael was ostracized for wanting to kill his father and consequently banished; afterwards, upon Yayael’s return, his father killed him and placed his bones inside a gourd to hang from the roof of the house, where it remained for a time. One day wishing to see his son, Yaya requested his wife to take down the gourd and empty it to see the bones of his son. From the gourd, many large and small fish gushed out. Seeing that the bones were transformed into fish, they resolved to eat them.

Along with expressing social norms, this first myth also establishes funerary rites and the cult of the dead. Supported by the descriptions provided by Columbus himself during his visit of eastern Cuba, it was a Taíno custom of burning the deceased and selecting the skull and long bones to “bury” them inside a gourd or woven basket that is to be hung from the roof of the house. As many other Amerindians, the Taíno considered bones not simply as symbols for the dead, death, sterility; quite the contrary, they were the source of life itself, and as the myth recounts, Yayael’s dead bones had the power to create ordered life in the primordial world  

The second myth recounts the story of the mischievous sons of Itiba Cahubaba, the ‘Great Bleeding Mother’ who died giving birth to her four sons. The first son, named Deminan Caracaracol led his unnamed brothers in misadventures of creation throughout the Caribbean primordial world. These mythic tricksters are known as civilizing heroes in the Taíno mythology. The myth begins with the hungry brothers entering Yaya's house to steal food; after they lowered the gourd where Yayael’s bones were placed and began eating fish, they heard Yaya returning, and while trying to hang the gourd back on the roof in haste, they dropped it and it broke. It is said that so much water came out of the gourd that it covered the earth and with it many fish poured out; and this is the oceans's origins.

The Quadruplets 

Similar to Yayaels case, after stealing and breaking the gourd, the punishment was banishment from Yaya’s chiefdom/land. The brothers were condemned to live away from the domain presided by the supreme being. Unlike Yayael, who returns home in defiance of Yaya, the four brothers never tried to return. Because of their compliance with the norm of banishment, the acquisition of culture was possible. It was the banishment that caused these culture heroes to begin the long journey that leads to the discovery of the secrets of culture for the benefit of humankind, such as agriculture, fire, and entheogenic plants.

Taíno myths recount that it was first Deminan and his brothers who learned about fire for cooking, and how to plant and harvest in order to make their staple cassava bread. They were the ones who wrestled from the proverbial mythical wise old man Baymanaco, the rituals and secrets of shamanism, healing, and magic, such as the use of tobacco, digo, and cohoba.  Robbing Bayamanaco established the cassava as a basic food in their diet; established the use of fire, which gives heat and light, and allows cooking; and established the knowledge of cohoba, a hallucinogenic plant that makes communication with the gods possible. The centerpiece of the religious ceremony crucial to the Taíno, cohoba is a plant (Anadenanthera peregrina) whose seeds, when crushed and mixed with an alkaline substance (like lime or ground burned shells), produce a powder that can be sniffed to induce hallucinogenic experiences—the effects of which have been discussed in depth by Gerardo Reichel-Dolmatoff (1971, 1975). It was therefore regarded by the Taíno as a sacred substance that permitted the ordinary person to transcend into the extraordinary world of the supernatural. The inhalation of powders from this plant was the most important religious and political ritual.

References 

Creation myths
Taíno mythology
Taíno
Caribbean mythology